Silvio Corio (1875, Turin − 1954, London), also called Crastinus, was an Italian anarchist who was active in London during the first half of the twentieth century.

Silvio was born in Turin, the son of Eugenio Corio and Chiara Domenica. Following some initial involvement with the Turin Socialist Club, he became active as an anarchist. He trained as a printer and typographer. He was conscripted in July 1897 and spent most of the next 18 months in a disciplinary battalion as a result of his political activity. However, in 1898 he fled to France in the face of the repression implemented by Luigi Pelloux.

He was in a long-term relationship with Sylvia Pankhurst and their son was the academic Richard Pankhurst.

References

1875 births
1954 deaths
Italian anarchists
Politicians from Turin
Italian emigrants to the United Kingdom
Politicians from London
Pankhurst family